Red Rose is a 1980 Indian Hindi-language psychological thriller film, starring Rajesh Khanna and Poonam Dhillon. It is a remake of the Tamil film Sigappu Rojakkal, made by the same director Bharathiraja and the same cinematographer P. S. Nivas.

Plot
Anand is a successful businessman with a dark side. He preys on nubile girls, seduces and kills them. These proceedings are video-recorded and watched by his adoptive father and mentor, another deranged woman-hater who, as with Anand, had a disillusioning experience with the female sex in his past. The old man stays holed up in a far corner of Anand's mansion watching his son carry out what he is too infirm to do. The murdered girls are buried in Anand's garden and a rosebush is grown above them.

Anand chances upon an undergarments salesgirl, Sharda and develops an attraction for her. Sharda, a conservative woman, insists that Anand must marry her if he wants to have his way with her. The romance proceeds and appears to be Anand's salvation before things begin to collapse for him. On his marriage day, Sharada stumbles upon a diary containing details of his deranged life along with names of the girls he had killed scribbled on the walls of one of the rooms in his large house.

Sharda, meanwhile stumbles upon Anand's father, whom Anand had told her was retarded and was not to be disturbed and gets the shock of her life. She somehow manages to shut him in and tries to run out, but as she prepares to leave, Anand returns. As Sharda tries to act normal while planning to escape, Anand finds that his father has been locked in and when he saves his father, he realizes that Sharda knows the truth about his deeds. A tense chase ensues, which ends in a graveyard in the dead of night, with Anand stumbling and falling on a cross which pierces him. In the ensuing chase, Anand is caught by the police.

He is subsequently jailed, but gets mentally retarded and loses his bloodthirsty ways. He keeps repeating Sharda's name, as it is his only coherent thought and all other memories have been erased from his mind.

Cast
Rajesh Khanna as Anand
Poonam Dhillon as Sharda
Om Shivpuri as Shera
Satyen Kappu as Anand's Foster Father
Anjana Mumtaz as Anjana
Shammi as Roopsagar Clothing Stores Manager
Aruna Irani as Sheela
Padmini Kapila as Chitra
Master Mayur as Young Anand "Munna"
Shashi Kiran as Waiter
Roopesh Kumar as Inspector Bhushan
Janagaraj as Servant

Soundtrack 
Music composed by R. D. Burman and lyrics were penned by Nida Fazli and Vitthalbhai Patel.

References

External links
 

1980 films
Indian erotic thriller films
1980s erotic thriller films
Hindi remakes of Tamil films
Indian serial killer films
Indian horror thriller films
1980s horror thriller films
Films directed by Bharathiraja
Fictional portrayals of the Maharashtra Police
Films scored by R. D. Burman
1980s Hindi-language films